The Carlsbad 5000 is an annual five kilometer (3.1 mile) road running event that takes place each spring in the city of Carlsbad, California along the north coast of San Diego County.

Organization
The event is organized by Groundwork Endurance, a San Diego-based company which acquired the race in 2018 from World Triathlon Corporation. Headlining the Groundwork Endurance ownership team is US Olympian, Meb Keflezighi, the only runner in history to win the NYC Marathon, Boston Marathon, and an Olympic Marathon medal.

Event overview
The event, which was first held in 1986, features seven 5k races, with participation in a specific race determined by each runners age and gender. The full day of running culminates with the men's and women's Skechers Performance Elite Invitationals, both of which feature professional fields competing for a substantial cash purse. In addition to the 5k races, there is a dedicated event for kids-only, the Junior Carlsbad, with distances ranging from a one mile fun run down to a diaper dash. The weekend also includes a free health and wellness expo, elite athlete Q&A, and post-race Pizza Port beer garden.

Course
The 5k race course begins on Grand Avenue in downtown Carlsbad before following a south-to-north loop on Carlsbad Boulevard along the Pacific coast. The southern turnaround is near Tamarack Avenue and the northern turnaround is located near the Army and Navy Academy. The course returns south before making a final turn onto Carlsbad Village Drive for a downhill finish in Carlsbad Village. The course is sanctioned and certified by USA Track and Field, the governing body for the sport.

Winners
The course records of 12:59.5 minutes for men (set by Sammy Kipketer in 2000) and 14:46 minutes for women (set by Meseret Defar in 2006) are the fastest times ever recorded for the 5 km road distance. These are recognized as world bests by the Association of Road Racing Statisticians. However, records for the road distance were not recognized by the IAAF until November 2017. In 2019, Kenyan Edward Cheserek won the men's elite invitational in a time of 13:29, which equalled the official IAAF record set earlier that same year. Cheserek returned to Carlsbad 5000 for his second consecutive win with a time of 13:44, one second away from second-place Reid Buchanan.

American Steve Scott not only helped design the course in 1986 but won the inaugural race en route to three straight victories. Other notable past winners include Eliud Kipchoge, Deena Kastor (Drossin), and Dejen Gebremeskel.

Past winners

Key:

See also
List of annual foot races in California

References

List of winners
Marty Post, Ryan Lamppa, Jack Leydig (2011-04-04). Carlsbad 5 km. Association of Road Racing Statisticians. Retrieved on 2011-04-10.

External links
Official website



5K runs
Foot races in California
Road running competitions in the United States
Recurring sporting events established in 1986
Carlsbad, California